Forest Stream is a symphonic black / doom / gothic metal band formed in Chernogolovka, Russia in 1995. The band draws inspiration from long and harsh Russian winters. Stylistically, the band's epic sound combines the atmosphere of the British doom metal of the 1990s and of the Norwegian black metal. The band's lyrics revolve around the themes of sorrow and hopelessness. Their first album, Tears of Mortal Solitude was released in early 2003 and was warmly received by the critics. In May 2007, the band went  on their first international tour in Ukraine. In September 2007, the band was signed by Candlelight Records  and recording for their second album, The Crown of Winter, commenced soon after. The band are currently believed to be unsigned with no mention of a new album, but are still active.

Members
 Sonm the Darkest – vocals
 Wizard Omin – guitars
 Stone R – bass
 Berserk – guitars
 Elhella – keyboards
 Kir – drums

Discography

Albums

 Tears of Mortal Solitude (2003)
 The Crown of Winter (2009)

Demos

 Snowfall (1999)
 Last Season Purity (2001)

References

External links

 Official Forest Stream
 Forest Stream at Encyclopaedia Metallum
 Forest Stream at Candlelight Records
 Forest Stream at Earache Records

Russian black metal musical groups
Earache Records artists
Musical groups established in 1995
Symphonic black metal musical groups
Candlelight Records artists